Justice Fox may refer to:

 Charles N. Fox (1829–1904), associate justice of the Supreme Court of California
 Cyril J. Fox (1889–1946), justice of the Newfoundland Supreme Court
 Edward Fox (judge) (1815–1881), associate justice of the Supreme Court of Maine
 Fred L. Fox (1876–1952), associate justice of the Supreme Court of Appeals of West Virginia
 James David Fox (1847–1910), associate justice of the Supreme Court of Missouri
 Kate M. Fox (born 1955), associate justice of the Wyoming Supreme Court

See also
Judge Fox (disambiguation)